Beni Mazar Sporting Club (Egyptian Arabic: بني مزار Bani Mazar), is an Egyptian football club based in Beni Mazar; El Minya Egypt. The club currently plays in the Egyptian Second Division, the second-highest league in the Egyptian football league system.

Egyptian Second Division
Football clubs in Egypt